Itch (also known as pruritus) is a sensation that causes the desire or reflex to scratch. Itch has resisted many attempts to be classified as any one type of sensory experience. Itch has many similarities to pain, and while both are unpleasant sensory experiences, their behavioral response patterns are different. Pain creates a withdrawal reflex, whereas itch leads to a scratch reflex.

Unmyelinated nerve fibers for itch and pain both originate in the skin; however, information for them is conveyed centrally in two distinct systems that both use the same nerve bundle and spinothalamic tract.

Classification
Most commonly, an itch is felt in one place. If it is felt all over the body, then it is called generalized itch or generalized pruritus.

If the sensation of itching persists for six weeks or longer, then it is called chronic itch or chronic pruritus. Chronic idiopathic pruritus or Chronic Pruritus of Unknown Origin is a form of itch that persists for longer than six weeks, and for which no clear cause can be identified.

Signs and symptoms
Pain and itch have very different behavioral response patterns. Pain elicits a withdrawal reflex, which leads to retraction and therefore a reaction trying to protect an endangered part of the body. Itch in contrast creates a scratch reflex, which draws one to the affected skin site. Itch generates stimulus of a foreign object underneath or upon the skin and also the urge to remove it. For example, responding to a local itch sensation is an effective way to remove insects from one's skin.

Scratching has traditionally been regarded as a way to relieve oneself by reducing the annoying itch sensation. However, there are hedonic aspects to scratching, as one would find noxious scratching highly pleasurable. This can be problematic with chronic itch patients, such as ones with atopic dermatitis, who may scratch affected spots until they no longer produce a pleasant or painful sensation, instead of when the itch sensation disappears. It has been hypothesized that motivational aspects of scratching include the frontal brain areas of reward and decision making. These aspects might therefore contribute to the compulsive nature of itch and scratching.

Contagious itch
Events of "contagious itch" are very common occurrences. Even a discussion on the topic of itch can give one the desire to scratch. Itch is likely to be more than a localized phenomenon in the place one scratches. Results from a study showed that itching and scratching were induced purely by visual stimuli in a public lecture on itching. The sensation of pain can also be induced in a similar fashion, often by listening to a description of an injury, or viewing an injury itself.

There is little detailed data on central activation for contagious itching, but it is hypothesized that a human mirror neuron system exists in which one imitates certain motor actions when they view others performing the same action. A similar hypothesis has been used to explain the cause of contagious yawning.

Itch inhibition due to pain
Studies done in the last decade have shown that itch can be inhibited by many other forms of painful stimuli, such as noxious heat, physical rubbing/scratching, noxious chemicals, and electric shock.

Causes

Infections
Body louse, found in substandard living conditions
Cutaneous larva migrans, a skin disease caused by hookworm infection
Head lice, if limited to the neck and scalp
Herpes, a viral disease
Insect bites, such as those from mosquitos or chiggers
Pubic lice, if limited to the genital area
Scabies, especially when several other persons in close contact also itch
Shaving, which may irritate the skin
Swimmer's itch, a short-term immune reaction
Varicella – i.e. chickenpox, prevalent among young children and highly contagious
Tungiasis, ectoparasite of skin

Environmental and allergic
Allergic reaction to contact with specific chemicals, such as urushiol, derived from poison ivy or poison oak, or Balsam of Peru, found in many foods and fragrances. Certain allergens may be diagnosed in a patch test.
Foreign objects on the skin are the most common cause of non-pathological itching. 
Photodermatitis – sunlight reacts with chemicals in the skin, leading to the formation of irritant metabolites.
Urticaria (also called hives) usually causes itching.

Skin disorders
 Dandruff; an unusually large amount of flaking is associated with this sensation.
 Punctate palmoplantar keratoderma, a group of disorders characterized by abnormal thickening of the palms and soles.
 Skin conditions (such as psoriasis, eczema, seborrhoeic dermatitis, sunburn, athlete's foot, and hidradenitis suppurativa). Most are of an inflammatory nature.
 Scab healing, scar growth, and the development or emergence of moles, pimples, and ingrown hairs from below the epidermis.
 Xerosis: dry skin, frequently seen in the winter and also associated with older age, frequent bathing in hot showers or baths, and high-temperature and low-humidity environments.

Other medical disorders
 Diabetes mellitus, a group of metabolic diseases in which a person has high blood sugar
 Hyperparathyroidism, overactivity of the parathyroid glands resulting in excess production of parathyroid hormone (PTH)
 Iron deficiency anemia, a common anemia (low red blood cell or hemoglobin levels)
 Cholestasis, where bile acids leaking into the serum activate peripheral opioid receptors, resulting in the characteristic generalized, severe itching
 Malignancy or internal cancer, such as lymphoma or Hodgkin's disease
 Polycythemia, which can cause generalized itching due to increased histamines
 Psychiatric disease ("psychogenic itch", as may be seen in delusional parasitosis)
 Thyroid illness
 Uraemia – the itching sensation this causes is known as uremic pruritus

Medication
 Drugs (such as opioids) that activate histamine (H1) receptors or trigger histamine release
 Chloroquine, a drug used in the treatment and prevention of malaria
 Bile acid congeners such as obeticholic acid

Related to pregnancy
 Gestational pemphigoid, a dermatosis of pregnancy
 Intrahepatic cholestasis of pregnancy, a medical condition in which cholestasis occurs
 Pruritic urticarial papules and plaques of pregnancy (PUPPP), a chronic hives-like rash

Other
 Menopause, or changes in hormonal balances associated with aging
Terminal illness

Mechanism
Itch can originate in the peripheral nervous system (dermal or neuropathic) or in the central nervous system (neuropathic, neurogenic, or psychogenic).

Dermal/pruritoceptive

Itch originating in the skin is known as pruritoceptive, and can be induced by a variety of stimuli, including mechanical, chemical, thermal, and electrical stimulation. The primary afferent neurons responsible for histamine-induced itch are unmyelinated C-fibres.

Two major classes of human C-fibre nociceptors exist: mechano-responsive nociceptors and mechano-insensitive nociceptors. Mechano-responsive nociceptors have been shown in studies to respond to mostly pain, and mechano-insensitive receptors respond mostly to itch induced by histamine. However, it does not explain mechanically induced itch or itch produced without a flare reaction that involves no histamine. Therefore, it is possible that pruritoceptive nerve fibres have different classes of fibres, which is unclear in current research.

Studies have been done to show that itch receptors are found only on the top two skin layers, the epidermis and the epidermal/dermal transition layers. Shelley and Arthur verified the depth by injecting individual itch powder (Mucuna pruriens) spicules and noting that maximal sensitivity occurred at the basal cell layer or the innermost layer of the epidermis. Surgical removal of those skin layers removed the ability for a patient to perceive itch. Itch is never felt in muscle or joints, which strongly suggests that deep tissue probably does not contain itch signaling apparatuses.

Itch is often classified as that which is histamine mediated (histaminergic) and nonhistaminergic.

Sensitivity to pruritic stimuli is evenly distributed across the skin and has a clear spot distribution with similar density to that of pain. The different substances that elicit itch upon intracutaneous injection (injection within the skin) elicit only pain when injected subcutaneously (beneath the skin).

Itch is readily abolished in skin areas treated with nociceptor excitotoxin capsaicin but remains unchanged in skin areas rendered touch insensitive by pretreatment with anti-inflammatory saponins. Although experimentally induced itch can still be perceived under a complete A-fiber conduction block, it is significantly diminished. Overall, itch sensation is mediated by A-delta and C nociceptors located in the uppermost layer of the skin.

Molecular diversity of itch transmitting primary afferents
Using single-cell mRNA sequencing, sensory-modality specific primary afferent have been molecularly defined into clusters based on gene expression patterns. Here, 11 sub clusters were detected; NF1-3, transmitting innocuous nociceptive information; NF4-5, which transmit proprioceptive information; NP1-3, transmitting itch information; PEP1-2, nociceptive information and TH, which is involved in pleasant touch, The pruriceptive NP1-3 were shown to express genes related to histaminergic and non-histaminergic signaling, where NF1 expresses genes responding to lysophosphatidic acid (Lpar3 and Lpar5), NP2 chloroquine-responsive genes (Mrgpra3 and Mrgprx1), whereas NP3 expresses neuropeptides Nppb and Sst as well as genes involved in inflammatory itch (Il31ra, Osmr and Crystrl2). The histamine receptor gene Hrh1 was found in NP2 and NP3, suggesting that histaminergic itch is transmitted by both these pruriceptive sub clusters.

The spinal itch pathway
After the pruriceptive primary afferent has been activated, the signal is transmitted from the skin into the spinal dorsal horn. In this area, a number of interneurons will either be inhibited or activated to promote activation of projection neurons, mediating the pruriceptive signal to the brain. The GRP-GRPR interneuron system has been found to be important for mediating both histaminergic and non-histaminergic itch, where the GRP neurons activate GRPR neurons to promote itch

Neuropathic
Neuropathic itch can originate at any point along the afferent pathway as a result of damage of the nervous system. They could include diseases or disorders in the central nervous system or peripheral nervous system. Examples of neuropathic itch in origin are notalgia paresthetica, brachioradial pruritus, brain tumors, multiple sclerosis, peripheral neuropathy, and nerve irritation.

Neurogenic
Neurogenic itch, which is itch induced centrally but with no neural damage, is mostly associated with increased accumulation of exogenous opioids and possibly synthetic opioids.

Psychogenic
Itch is also associated with some symptoms of psychiatric disorders such as tactile hallucinations, delusions of parasitosis, or obsessive-compulsive disorders (as in OCD-related neurotic scratching).

Peripheral sensitization
Inflammatory mediators—such as bradykinin, serotonin (5-HT) and prostaglandins—released during a painful or pruritic inflammatory condition not only activate pruriceptors but also cause acute sensitization of the nociceptors. In addition, expression of neuro growth factors (NGF) can cause structural changes in nociceptors, such as sprouting. NGF is high in injured or inflamed tissue. Increased NGF is also found in atopic dermatitis, a hereditary and non-contagious skin disease with chronic inflammation. NGF is known to up-regulate neuropeptides, especially substance P. Substance P has been found to have an important role in inducing pain; however, there is no confirmation that substance P directly causes acute sensitization. Instead, substance P may contribute to itch by increasing neuronal sensitization and may affect release of mast cells, which contain many granules rich in histamine, during long-term interaction.

Central sensitization
Noxious input to the spinal cord is known to produce central sensitization, which consists of allodynia, exaggeration of pain, and punctuate hyperalgesia, extreme sensitivity to pain. Two types of mechanical hyperalgesia can occur: 1) touch that is normally painless in the uninjured surroundings of a cut or tear can trigger painful sensations (touch-evoked hyperalgesia), and 2) a slightly painful pin prick stimulation is perceived as more painful around a focused area of inflammation (punctuate hyperalgesia). Touch-evoked hyperalgesia requires continuous firing of primary afferent nociceptors, and punctuate hyperalgesia does not require continuous firing which means it can persist for hours after a trauma and can be stronger than normally experienced. In addition, it was found that patients with neuropathic pain, histamine ionophoresis resulted in a sensation of burning pain rather than itch, which would be induced in normal healthy patients. This shows that there is spinal hypersensitivity to C-fiber input in chronic pain.

Treatment

A variety of over-the-counter and prescription anti-itch drugs are available. Some plant products have been found to be effective anti-pruritics, others not. Non-chemical remedies include cooling, warming, soft stimulation.

Topical antipruritics in the form of creams and sprays are often available over-the-counter. Oral anti-itch drugs also exist and are usually prescription drugs. The active ingredients usually belong to the following classes:

 Antihistamines, such as diphenhydramine (Benadryl)
 Corticosteroids, such as hydrocortisone topical cream; see topical steroid
 Counterirritants, such as mint oil, menthol, or camphor
 Crotamiton (trade name Eurax) is an antipruritic agent available as a cream or lotion, often used to treat scabies. Its mechanism of action remains unknown.
 Local anesthetics, such as benzocaine topical cream (Lanacane)

Phototherapy is helpful for severe itching, especially if caused by kidney failure. The common type of light used is UVB.

Sometimes scratching relieves isolated itches, hence the existence of devices such as the back scratcher. Often, however, scratching only offers temporary relief and can intensify itching, even causing further damage to the skin, dubbed the "itch-scratch cycle".

The mainstay of therapy for dry skin is maintaining adequate skin moisture and topical emollients.

No studies have been conducted to investigate the effectiveness of emollient creams, cooling lotions, topical corticosteroids, topical antidepressants, systemic antihistamines, systemic antidepressants, systemic anticonvulsants, and phototherapy on chronic pruritus of unknown origin. However, there are clinical trials currently underway with dupilumab which is thought to alleviate itch by acting on the IL-4 receptor on sensory neurons.   The effectiveness of therapeutic options for people who are terminally ill with malignant cancer is not known.

History
In 1660, German physician Samuel Hafenreffer introduced the definition of pruritus (itch).

Epidemiology
Approximately 280 million people globally, 4% of the population, have difficulty with itchiness. This is comparable to the 2–3% of the population who have psoriasis.

See also 
 Feeling, a perceptual state of conscious experience.
 Formication, a sensation that resembles that of small insects crawling on or under the skin
 Pruritus ani (also known as anusitis), irritation of skin at the exit of the rectum (anus), causing the desire to scratch
 Referred itch, a phenomenon in which a stimulus applied in one region of the body is felt as an itch or irritation in a different part of the body
 Itching powder, a powder or powder-like substance that induces itching when applied onto human skin.

References

Further reading 

 
 
 

Pruritic skin conditions